The Lion Children is a story about a group of children who are taken to Botswana in 1995 by their mother Kate Nicholls to study the behaviour of lions.

The book was praised by British biologist Richard Dawkins who wrote a foreword and said, "This is an astonishing book, by an even more astonishing group of children."

Notes and references 

2001 non-fiction books
British travel books
English non-fiction books
Books about lions
Zoology books
African travel books